North Whitesand Lake is a lake in the Unorganized Part of Thunder Bay District in Northwestern Ontario, Canada. It is the source of the Whitesand River, and is part of the Great Lakes Basin (Lake Superior basin).

There are two unnamed inflows: one at the northeast and one at the southeast. The primary outflow, at the west of the lake and heading west, is the Whitesand River.

References

Lakes of Thunder Bay District